A list of Brazilian Academy Award winners and nominees appears below. The first Brazilian to be nominated for an Academy Award was Ary Barroso, one of Música Popular Brasileira's greatest composers, in 1945. As of 2023, only one Brazilian has been awarded: production designer Luciana Arrighi won the Academy Award for Best Art Direction for Howards End in 1993. This list is current as of the 95th Academy Awards ceremony held on 12 March 2023.

Best Picture

Best Director

Best Actress – Leading Role

Best Art Direction

Best Cinematography

Best Documentary Feature

Best Film Editing

Best International Feature Film

Best Live Action Short Film

Best Animated Short Film

Best Animated Feature 

Note: Ice Age was nominated for this category in 2003. The film was an American production co-directed by American director Chris Wedge and Brazilian director Carlos Saldanha. However, the Academy only nominated Wedge.

Best Original Song

Best Writing – Adapted Screenplay

Best Documentary - Short Subject

References 

Brazilian